The Clary's Mountain Historic District comprises  on either side of Hammond's Mill Road east of Hedgesville, West Virginia. The  district contains six mostly wood-framed houses from the late 19th and early 20th century, with a total of twelve structures, including outbuildings. The oldest house, the Thomas Payne House at Hammond's Mill Road, was built in 1879. The Ward-Lemaster House (612 Hammond's Mill Road)) was built in 1905 with eclectic detailing. 627 Hammond's Mill Road was built about 1894. The Lee Lingamfelter House at 611 incorporates Eastlake detailing. The Dr. D.R. Ross House at 589 was built in 1885, and the Morris-Kilmer House is an American Foursquare from about 1920.

The neighborhood lies at the foot of Potato Hill, a component of the North Mountain ridge. The district was listed on the National Register of Historic Places on April 15, 2004.

References

Houses on the National Register of Historic Places in West Virginia
Gothic Revival architecture in West Virginia
Victorian architecture in West Virginia
Historic districts in Berkeley County, West Virginia
American Foursquare architecture in West Virginia
Houses in Berkeley County, West Virginia
Historic districts on the National Register of Historic Places in West Virginia
National Register of Historic Places in Berkeley County, West Virginia